The Oldman Formation is a stratigraphic unit of Late Cretaceous (Campanian stage) age that underlies much of southern Alberta, Canada. It consists primarily of sandstones that were deposited in fluvial channel and floodplain environments.  It was named for exposures along the Oldman River between its confluence with the St. Mary River and the city of Lethbridge, and it is known primarily for its dinosaur remains and other fossils.

Lithology 
The Oldman Formation is composed primarily of light-colored, fine-grained sandstones.  They are upward-fining, lenticular to sheet-like bodies that are yellowish, steep-faced and blocky in outcrop.  The formation also includes lesser amounts of siltstone and mudstone.

Depositional environments 
 
The sediments of the Oldman Formation were deposited in fluvial channels (the sandstones) and a variety of channel margin, overbank and floodplain environments (the siltstones and mudstones). It thickens toward the southwest, and northwestern Montana appears to have been the primary source of the sediments.

Relationship to other units 
The Oldman Formation is a member of the Belly River Group (also known as the Judith River Group).  It conformably overlies the Foremost Formation, and is separated from the overlying Dinosaur Park Formation by a regional disconformity. The sediments of the Oldman are superficially similar to those of the Dinosaur Park, which was included in the Oldman Formation prior to the recognition of the disconformity. The two formations can also be distinguished by petrographic and sedimentologic differences.

Age 
The Oldman Formation was deposited during the middle Campanian, between about 77.5 and 76.5 million years ago. It lies fully within magnetic polarity Chron 33n.

Fossil content 
List of dinosaurs found in the formation:

Theropods

Ornithischians

See also 
 List of fossil sites (with link directory)
 List of dinosaur-bearing rock formations

References

Bibliography 
 D.A. Eberth. 1996. Origin and significance of mud-filled incised valleys (Upper Cretaceous) in southern Alberta, Canada. Sedimentology 43:459–477
 Ryan, M. J., and Russell, A. P., 2001. Dinosaurs of Alberta (exclusive of Aves): In: Mesozoic Vertebrate Life, edited by Tanke, D. H., and Carpenter, K., Indiana University Press, pp. 279–297

Geologic formations of Alberta
Stratigraphy of Alberta
Upper Cretaceous Series of North America
Cretaceous Alberta
Campanian Stage
Sandstone formations
Fluvial deposits
Ooliferous formations
Western Canadian Sedimentary Basin